Vicente Martín Sánchez Bragunde (born 7 December 1979) is a Uruguayan former professional footballer who last played as a right winger for Rio Grande Valley FC Toros in the USL Championship. He has the second most goals all time for Deportivo Toluca and the eighth most appearances for Toluca.

Club career
Sánchez was born in Montevideo. He played for Sud América, Tacuarembó, Deportivo Toluca, FC Schalke 04, América and Nacional. On 18 January 2008, he joined German club Schalke, where he remained for two seasons. He played in Mexico again for Club América. On 1 August 2010, he scored his first goal for Club América in a match versus Chiapas.

Sánchez made the move to Major League Soccer on 6 August 2013 when he signed for Colorado Rapids. On 14 September 2013, he scored his first goal for Colorado and forced an own goal in a 2–1 win over FC Dallas. He quickly became an integral part of the team and became the designated penalty taker. To start the 2014 season Sanchez scored 4 pk goals in the first 3 games for Colorado.

Even with his play time being carefully managed and his appearances limited to substitutions in the last half of most games, Sánchez was a bright spot in an otherwise lackluster Colorado Rapids 2015 Major League Soccer season.  Despite being a crowd favorite with the Colorado Rapids fans and the #2 scorer for the team, Sánchez's 2016 contract option was declined as the Colorado Rapids front office set out to acquire new talent in the form of players such as Marco Pappa, Shkëlzen Gashi, Jermaine Jones and Tim Howard.  Sánchez went through the MLS Re-Entry Draft but was not selected by any other team.

He joined his hometown club Defensor Sporting for the 2016 Primera Division Clausura season and helped his team finish fourth, qualifying for the 2017 Copa Sudamericana.

Sánchez returned to MLS and joined the Houston Dynamo for the 2017 season. He helped the Dynamo reach the playoff and got the game winning assist in their opening game versus Sporting Kansas City.

On 2 April 2021, it was announced that Sánchez would come out of retirement to play and coach for USL Championship side Rio Grande Valley FC.

International career
He played for Uruguay national football team in the 2007 Copa América and has won 31 caps for the national side, scoring five goals.

International goals

|-
|1||13 July 2004||Estadio Miguel Grau, Piura||||2–2||2–4 (L)||2004 Copa América
|-
|2||24 July 2004||Estadio Garcilaso de la Vega, Cuzco||||1–2||1–2 (W)||2004 Copa América
|-
|3||18 October 2006||Estadio Centenario, Montevideo||||1–0||4–0 (W)||Friendly
|-
|4|| 30 June 2007||Estadio Polideportivo, San Cristóbal||||0–1||0–1 (W)||2007 Copa América
|-
|5||13 October 2007||Estadio Centenario, Montevideo||||4–0||5–0 (W)||2010 FIFA World Cup qualification
|}

Personal life
Sánchez holds a U.S. green card which qualifies him as a domestic player for MLS roster purposes.

Honours
Toluca
Primera División de México: Apertura 2002, Apertura 2005
CONCACAF Champion's Cup: 2003

Schalke 04
Bundesliga: Runner-up 2009–10

Uruguay
Copa América Third Place: 2004; Fourth Place: 2007

Individual
Mexican Primera División Golden Ball: Apertura 2006

References

External links
 

1979 births
Living people
Association football forwards
Colorado Rapids players
Club Nacional de Football players
Houston Dynamo FC players
Expatriate footballers in Germany
Expatriate footballers in Mexico
Expatriate soccer players in the United States
Uruguayan Primera División players
Bundesliga players
Liga MX players
Major League Soccer players
Sud América players
Footballers from Montevideo
FC Schalke 04 players
Tacuarembó F.C. players
Deportivo Toluca F.C. players
Club América footballers
2004 Copa América players
2007 Copa América players
Uruguay international footballers
Uruguayan expatriate footballers
Uruguayan footballers
Rio Grande Valley FC Toros players